Etelka Kispál (born 25 January 1941) is a Hungarian sprinter. She competed in the women's 4 × 100 metres relay at the 1968 Summer Olympics.

References

1941 births
Living people
Athletes (track and field) at the 1964 Summer Olympics
Athletes (track and field) at the 1968 Summer Olympics
Hungarian female sprinters
Hungarian female long jumpers
Olympic athletes of Hungary
Place of birth missing (living people)